Troels Kløve Hallstrøm (born 23 October 1990) is a Danish professional footballer who plays for SønderjyskE, on loan from OB, as a midfielder.

Career
Kløve started playing football for Hatting/Torsted as a six-year-old but moved to the AC Horsens youth academy in 2003. He made his senior debut for the club on 19 June 2010 in a second-tier Danish 1st Division match against BK Frem, coming on as a substitute in the 60th minute for André Bjerregaard.

On 12 June 2015, Kløve signed a three-year contract with SønderjyskE.

Kløve moved to OB on 24 January 2018. He made his debut for the club on 12 February in a 6–1 win over FC Helsingør, in which he provided two assists. On 8 July 2022, Kløve returned to SønderjyskE on a two-year loan deal. A few days later, due to FIFA's new rules which did not allow two-year loan deals, the clubs announced that it was only a one-year loan.

References

1990 births
Living people
Danish men's footballers
AC Horsens players
SønderjyskE Fodbold players
Odense Boldklub players
Danish Superliga players
Danish 1st Division players
Association football midfielders
People from Horsens
Hatting/Torsted IF players
Sportspeople from the Central Denmark Region